Terrestrial orbit may refer to:
 the orbit of the Earth around the Sun
 a geocentric orbit, orbit of an object around the Earth
 a geosynchronous orbit
 a geostationary orbit

See also
 Venusian orbit (disambiguation)
 Martian orbit (disambiguation)